Hezarrud may refer to:
 Hezarrud-e Olya
 Hezarrud-e Sofla